A sympoliteia, anglicized as sympolity, was a type of treaty for political organization in ancient Greece. By the time of the Hellenistic period, it occurred in two forms. In mainland Greece, the term was often used for a federal state consisting of individual poleis (city-states) with shared political institutions and citizenship. Examples of this are the Achaean League and the Aetolian League. The term was also used for the political merger of two or more neighboring poleis. This could eventually, but not necessarily, lead to the disappearance of one of the participating poleis. This second form was especially common in Hellenistic Asia Minor.

A sympoliteia is often contrasted with an isopoliteia, a treaty which granted equal citizenship to the citizens of the participating poleis but maintained their political independence. Contemporary writers of the Hellenistic period could use the term loosely, Polybius for example used the term sympoliteia to refer to the shared citizenship granted by both treaties. In similar fashion there was also considerable overlap between the concepts of synoecism and sympoliteia.

See also
 Koinon

References

Sources

Ancient Greek law
Treaties of ancient Greece
Greek words and phrases
Leagues in Greek Antiquity